Run For Time (Chinese: 全员加速中 Pinyin: Quányuán Jiāsù Zhōng), literally All Members Accelerating, is a Chinese variety show broadcasting on Hunan Television channel. The idea of the show is based on Fuji Television Network, Inc's . In September 2017, Hunan TV announced the show will not be renewed for its third season.

Cast 
Run For Time features an all-star cast.

Season 1
 Huang Xiaoming
 Jia Nailiang 
 Luo Jin
 TFBOYS: Wang Yuan
 TFBOYS: Yi Yangqianxi
 TFBOYS: Wang Junkai
 Du Chun
 Ada Choi
 Tian Liang
 Zang Hongna
 Shawn Dou
 Li Yundi
 Li Xiaolu
 Bao Chunlai
 Fan Tiantian
 Zhang Yijie
 Zhang Liang
 Chen Ou
 Song Weilong (actor/model)
 SNH48: Ju Jingyi
 SNH48: Zhao Jiamin
 Huang Qishan
 Shen Mengchen
 Happy Family: Xie Na
 Chen Xiang
 Wang Likun
 Hawick Lau
 Jia Ling
 Elvis Han
 Jin Chen
 Zhang Xinyu
 Huang Chia-chien
 Sun Jian
 Huang Yali
 Wang Likun 
 Li Xiaolu
 Gan Wei
 Wang Kai
 The Flowers: Da Zhangwei
 Zeng Shunxi
 Gigi Leung
 Ma Ke
 SHE: ELLA
 Twins: Ah Sa
 Yu Haoming
 A-Lin
 Qu Ying
 Bai Kainan
 Shen Ling
 Chen Sicheng
 Xiaoshenyang
 Wang Baoqiang
 Ady An

Season 2
 Huang Jingyu (Censored from recorded episode due to SARFT)
 Xu Weizhou (Censored from recorded episode due to SARFT)
 Du Chun
 Tian Liang
 Song Xiaobao
 Happy Family: Du Haitao
 Li Jia Hang
 Happy Family: Wu Xin
 Jia Nailiang
 The Flowers: Da Zhangwei
 Lin Yun
 SHE: ELLA
 Shen Mengchen
 Liu Wen
 Myolie Wu
 Fahrenheit: Jiro Wang (Wang Dong-cheng)
 Wei Daxun
 Qiao Shan
 Twins: Ah Sa
 Zhang Liang
 Girl's Generation Jessica Jung 
 Hwang Chi Yeul
 Gary Chaw

Rules 
In every season 1 episode of Run For Time, four hunters are sent out to capture seventeen or eighteen guest stars (or escapees). For every second the escapees survive, they gain 50 in-game credits, which will accumulate over the first eight episodes for the finals (ninth episode). If the escapees are caught by the hunters, they will be eliminated and are permitted to keep only ten percent of their credits for that particular round. Meanwhile, they have to complete certain tasks thrown to them in a given time frame while hiding from the hunters. If the escapees find a "refuge", they can choose to sign out and leave with the credits they have. If the escapees survive the whole course of 90 minutes(sometimes 100 minutes), they will be handsomely rewarded with 270,000 credits(or 300,000 in a 100-minute game).

The hunters cannot have any sort of communication with the escapees. They can only sprint when they see an escapee, and they cannot determine the escapee's location by looking for the cameramen. If the escapees manage to hide or run away from the hunter, the hunter will give up the chase.

References 

Chinese variety television shows
ja:Run for money 逃走中#Run For Time 全員加速中